Shadowplay is a 2022 Czech-Slovak crime thriller film directed by Peter Bebjak. The film was originally to be released on 23 October 2021 but was delayed due to COVID-19 pandemic.

Cast
 Milan Ondrík
 Hynek Čermák
 Vladimír Javorský
 Dominika Morávková
 Kristýna Frejová
 Leona Skleničková
 Jan Jankovský

References

External links
 
 Shadowplay at CSFD.cz 

2022 films
Czech crime drama films
Czech crime thriller films
Slovak crime films
Slovak thriller films
2020s Czech-language films